Ghulam Muhammad Malik (also called G.M. Malik) is former commander of the 10 Corps, Rawalpindi of the Pakistan Army. 10 Corps was responsible to defend the entire Line of Control between Pakistan administered Kashmir and the Indian-administered Kashmir. He retired from the army in 1995, and has since headed a charity to build hospitals and medical facilities for the poor in various parts of Pakistan.

Early life

Malik belongs to the Awan tribe. He is from Sargodha, Pakistan which is a prime recruiting area for Pakistan's army.

Army 

He had a distinguished military career. As a cadet in PMA, he was selected to be sent to Royal Military Academy Sandhurst where he was declared the best cadet and won the "Queen's Gold Medal".

Malik is a graduate of PAF Public School Sargodha where he was from 1st Entry (1953–1957).

He joined Pakistan Army in the late 1950s, and became a lieutenant general. He served as commandant of the Pakistan Military Academy from 1987 to 1989. In the 1990s, he was given command of the X Corps.

Retirement 

Malik retired in April 2000 and was succeeded by then DG Military Intelligence (DGMI) Maj Gen Ali Kuli Khan Khattak.

References

Pakistani generals
Living people
Graduates of the Royal Military Academy Sandhurst
PAF College Sargodha alumni
Year of birth missing (living people)